XHWK-FM is a radio station on 101.5 FM near Guadalajara, Jalisco, Mexico. It began in 1954 as a rebroadcaster of XEW-AM.

History
Cadena Radio Guadalajara, S.A., received the concession for XEWK-AM on 1190 kHz on October 28, 1954, though six months earlier on April 27, provisional transmissions had been authorized. The concessionaire was changed in 1994. The AM station operated 50 kilowatts during the day and 10 kilowatts at night on 1190 kHz from a transmitter at Atemajac del Valle, Zapopan, Jalisco.

In 2017, XEWK-AM was authorized for second-wave AM-FM migration on 101.5 MHz as XHWK-FM. The station signed on March 27, 2020 and came into official service days later; the AM was turned off at 11:59 p.m. on March 29, 2021.

References

External links

Radio stations established in 1954
Guadalajara metropolitan area
Radiópolis
Radio stations in Guadalajara